The Whiteoaks of Jalna was a 1972 Canadian television drama miniseries, based on the novel by Mazo de la Roche. At , it set a record expense at the time for a Canadian television miniseries. The series was exported internationally including the United Kingdom and France. Scriptwriting was led by Timothy Findley, supported by Claude Harz and Grahame Woods.

Plot

Production
 Due to the convoluted nature of the storyline, which jumped back and forth between the 1850s to the 1970s, CBC published a family tree of the characters in the miniseries, so viewers could follow the story.
 The miniseries was originally planned to extend beyond 13 episodes, but production was curtailed by a CBC technicians' strike that year.
 Despite this being a CBC production, the original run of the mini-series was blacked out on CKLW-TV in Windsor, Ontario (then partially owned by the CBC), as the CBC originally planned to sell the series to an American network or syndicator. Such a sale did not materialize.
 The miniseries was rebroadcast in 1974, but was re-edited with extra footage added and some scenes (especially those taking place in the modern day) cut.

Sources
  TV North: Everything You Ever Wanted to Know About Canadian Television, by Peter Kenter and Martin Levin

External links

Queen's University Directory of CBC Television Series: The Whiteoaks of Jalna, accessed 10 September 2006
 

CBC Television original programming
1972 Canadian television series debuts
1972 Canadian television series endings
1970s Canadian drama television series
1970s Canadian television miniseries
Works by Timothy Findley
Television series based on novels